Sobotka is a town in Jičín District in the Hradec Králové Region of the Czech Republic. It has about 2,400 inhabitants. The town centre is well preserved and is protected by law as an urban monument zone.

Administrative parts

Villages of Čálovice, Kdanice, Lavice, Spyšova, Staňkova Lhota, Stéblovice, Trní and Zajakury are administrative parts of Sobotka.

Geography
It lies in the Jičín Uplands. The northern part of the municipal territory lies in the Bohemian Paradise Protected Landscape Area.

History
The first written mention of Sobotka is from 1322. For centuries, it belonged to the Kost Castle estate. In 1498, Sobotka was promoted to a town by Vladislaus II. The development of the town was hampered by frequent fires, the biggest ones were in 1710, 1746 and 1825. In 1903, the railway was put into operation, but it did not bring an economic boom to the town.

Demographics

Culture
Since 1957, Sobotka hosts an annual festival of Czech language, speech and literature called Šrámkova Sobotka. The festival is named after the most famous local native, writer Fráňa Šrámek.

Sights

The most valuable building is the Humprecht Castle, a national cultural monument. It was built for Humprecht Jan Czernin by Italian architect Carlo Lurago in 1666–1668, as a summer house and hunting castle. It has atypical elliptical shape of its floor plan. In 1678, it was damaged by a fire, and in 1680, it was repaired and increased by one floor. Its appearance has not changed since then.

The historic centre is formed by Míru Square. It is known for preserved burgher houses and former town hall. Behind the square there is the Church of Saint Mary Magdalene. It was built in the late Gothic style in 1590–1596 and replaced an old wooden church from the 14th century. It has late Baroque interiors.

There are several preserved buildings of folk architecture in the town. The most notable is Šolc Farmhouse from 1811.

Notable people
Fráňa Šrámek (1877–1952), writer

Twin towns – sister cities

Sobotka is twinned with:
 Sobótka, Poland
 Wadern, Germany

Gallery

References

External links

Humprecht Castle

Cities and towns in the Czech Republic
Populated places in Jičín District